The 1916 Akron football team represented the University of Akron, formerly Buchtel College, in the 1916 college football season. The team was led by head coach Fred Sefton, in his second season. Akron was outscored by their opponents by a total of 90–183. In their first game of the season, a 53–0 win over Baldwin-Wallace, the team recorded its 50th win in program history.

Schedule

References

Akron
Akron Zips football seasons
Akron football